Celsia can refer to:

Plants
 Celsia Boehm., nom. illeg., considered a synonym of Colchicum
 Celsia Heist. ex Fabr., nom. illeg., considered a synonym of Ornithogalum
 Verbascum, various species, particularly V. bugulifolium, a garden plant formerly known as Celsia bugulifolia

Insects
 Staurophora celsia, a moth

Other
An electricity generation and distribution company owned by Grupo Argos

See also
 Celsian, a feldspar mineral